Science Max: Experiments at Large is a Canadian children's television series, which premiered on TVOntario's TVOKids programming block in 2015. Hosted by Phil McCordic, the series educates viewers about science through large-scale experiments to demonstrate scientific principles.

The series also features an interactive online component.

The series won three Canadian Screen Awards at the 5th Canadian Screen Awards in 2017 and the 6th Canadian Screen Awards in 2018, for Best Children's or Youth Non-Fiction Program and Best Cross-Platform Digital Project.

References

External links
 
 

2010s Canadian children's television series
2015 Canadian television series debuts
TVO original programming
Canadian children's education television series